The Medal "For Transforming the Non-Black Earth of the RSFSR" was a civilian award of the Soviet Union established on September 30, 1977 by Decree of the Presidium of the Supreme Soviet of the USSR to recognise three years of dedicated work in developing Soviet agriculture in the non-black earth regions of the Russian Soviet Federative Socialist Republic.  The medal's statute was amended on July 18, 1980 by decree of the Presidium of the Supreme Soviet of the USSR № 2523-X.

Medal statute
The Medal "For Transforming the Non-Black Earth of the RSFSR" was awarded to workers, farmers and employees who made an impact on the work of implementation of the long-term program for the development for agriculture of the non-black earth zone of the  Russian Soviet Federative Socialist Republic, and who worked as a rule, for not less than three years in this field and that were located on state or collective farms, or worked in businesses, organizations or institutions whose activities were directly related to the transformation of the non-black earth.

Recommendations for award of the Medal "For Transforming the Non-Black Earth of the RSFSR" were made by the administrative heads of enterprises, institutions, organizations, boards of collective farms, party, trade union or Komsomol organizations labour groups, and sent to the executive committee of the District or City Council of People's Deputies for review. The names of the recipients was then forwarded to the executive committee of the Regional Soviet of People's Deputies of the Supreme Soviet of the autonomous republic, which, after final consideration, awarded the medal on behalf of the Presidium of the Supreme Soviet of the RSFSR in the communities of the recipients.

The Medal "For Transforming the Non-Black Earth of the RSFSR" was worn on the left side of the chest and in the presence of other medals of the USSR, immediately after the Medal "For Construction of the Baikal-Amur Railway".  If worn in the presence of awards of the Russian Federation, the latter have precedence.

Each medal came with an attestation of award, this attestation came in the form of a small 8 cm by 11 cm cardboard booklet bearing the award's name, the recipient's particulars and an official stamp and signature on the inside.

Medal description
The Medal "For Transforming the Non-Black Earth of the RSFSR" was a 32 mm in diameter circular medal struck from tombac.  On the obverse, in the right half, the relief image of a tractor pulling a plough through a field below a rising Sun over a distant tree line; at left the relief images of barns, grain elevators and power transmission towers; along the medal's lower circumference, the relief inscription "For transforming the Non-Black Earth of the RSFSR", along the upper left circumference, a panicle of wheat; the obverse had a raised rim.  On the reverse, at center, the relief image of the hammer and sickle with wheat spikes below a relief five pointed star emitting rays.

The Medal "For Transforming the Non-Black Earth of the RSFSR" was secured to a standard Soviet pentagonal mount by a ring through the medal suspension loop. The mount was covered by a 24 mm wide overlapping green silk moiré ribbon with 2 mm yellow edge stripes and a 6 mm central blue stripe.

Recipients (partial list)
The individuals below were recipients of the Medal "For Transforming the Non-Black Earth of the RSFSR":

1st Head of the Republic of Mordovia Nikolay Ivanovich Merkushkin
Former head of the Bryansk Region Vladimir Aleksandrovich Barabanov
Cherevkovsky farm director Yuri Arsent'evich Bareshkin
Farm worker Valentina Dimitrieva
Politician and businessman Petr Anatol'evich Karpov
Doctor Leonid Vladimirovich Ponomarev
Vladimir Grigor'evich Matrosov
Aleksandr Vasil'evich Gruzdev
Nikolai Dmitrievich Belousov
Viktor Alekseevich Vlasov
Aleksandr Nikolaevich Surin

See also
Orders, decorations, and medals of the Soviet Union

References

External links
 Legal Library of the USSR
 The Russian Gazette

Civil awards and decorations of the Soviet Union
Awards established in 1977
1977 establishments in the Soviet Union
Agriculture in the Soviet Union